Claire Celdran Rodriguez (born August 22, 1980) is a Filipino broadcast journalist. She is a news anchor for various programs at CNN Philippines. She previously worked at ANC, EBRU TV and Solar News Channel.

Television

References

1977 births
Living people
Filipino television journalists
Solar News and Current Affairs people
People from Manila
Filipino people of Spanish descent
CNN people